India participated in the 2003 Asian Winter Games held in Aomori Prefecture, Japan,  from February 1 to February 8. India failed to win any medals in the Games.

Nations at the 2003 Asian Winter Games
2003 in Indian sport
India at the Asian Winter Games